Compilation Appearances Vol. 1 is a compilation album by Lycia, released on January 30, 2001 by Projekt Records.

Track listing

Personnel 
Adapted from the Compilation Appearances Vol. 1 liner notes.
Dick Charles – mastering
Sam Rosenthal – mastering, design
Mike VanPortfleet – vocals, synthesizer, guitar, drum machine, photography, design

Release history

References 

2001 compilation albums
Lycia (band) albums
Projekt Records compilation albums